Krisztina Czakó (born 17 December 1978) is a Hungarian former figure skater. She is the 1997 European silver medalist and 1994 Skate Canada International champion.

Career

Czakó was born in Budapest, Hungary. Her mother Klara was a speed skater, while her father and coach György Czakó was himself a figure skater and a former Hungarian men's national champion. György began teaching Krisztina how to skate before she was a year old, making her a pair of skates himself when none could be found that were small enough to fit her.

Czakó was the youngest athlete to compete in the 1992 Winter Olympics, at age 13 years and 2 months. She was so young that she was still able to compete in the World Junior Championship in 1994 and 1995 (finishing second and third, respectively), despite her Olympic experience. She made her second Olympic appearance in Lillehammer, Norway in 1994, finishing 11th. She intended to compete in her third Olympics in 1998 but had to withdraw due to injury.

Czakó won the silver medal at the 1997 European Championships skating her long program to the music of The Addams Family. It was the first medal for Hungary in the European ladies' event since 1971. Czakó also achieved a career-best 7th-place finish at the 1997 World Championships. 

Czakó was a seven-time Hungarian national champion (1992-1998), and represented her country in two Olympics, six World Championships, and six European championships, along with numerous other competitions. She is now retired from competitive skating.

Results
GP: Champions Series (Grand Prix)

References

External links 
 Krisztina Czakó official home page

Navigation 

1978 births
Living people
Hungarian female single skaters
Figure skaters at the 1992 Winter Olympics
Figure skaters at the 1994 Winter Olympics
Olympic figure skaters of Hungary
European Figure Skating Championships medalists
World Junior Figure Skating Championships medalists
Competitors at the 1999 Winter Universiade
Figure skaters from Budapest